Wrestling Dontaku 2018 was a professional wrestling event promoted by New Japan Pro-Wrestling (NJPW). The event took place on May 3 and 4, 2018, in Fukuoka, at the Fukuoka Kokusai Center. The first night of the event featured nine matches, with a championship at stake in one of these, while the second night featured two championship matches out of nine overall. The main event of the first night was Kenny Omega against Hangman Page, and the second night's main event was Kazuchika Okada defending the IWGP Heavyweight Championship against Hiroshi Tanahashi. This was the fifteenth event under the Wrestling Dontaku name.

Storylines

Each night of Wrestling Dontaku 2018 featured nine professional wrestling matches that involved different wrestlers from pre-existing scripted feuds and storylines. Wrestlers portrayed villains, heroes, or less distinguishable characters in the scripted events that built tension and culminated in a wrestling match or series of matches.

Results

Night 1

Night 2

References

External links
The official New Japan Pro-Wrestling website

2018
2018 in professional wrestling
May 2018 events in Japan